Sascha David Lenhart (born 16 December 1973) is a German former professional footballer who played as a midfielder.

Career
Lenhart began his career as a German youth international, being part of the Germany U20 national team in the 1993 FIFA World Youth Championship, coming on as a substitute in a 2–1 defeat to Uruguay U20 and made ten appearances in the Belgian First Division.

Lenhart joined Leicester City in 1996 on a month-long contract after impressing Martin O'Neill during his trial with the club, playing in two reserve games. In September 1996, he came on as a substitute for Jamie Lawrence in a 2–1 win over Scarborough in the Coca-Cola Cup 2nd round, second leg after Lawrence suffered a head injury after scoring Leicester's first goal. It was his only Leicester appearance which led to his release by the club despite returning from Germany after recuperation.

In 1999, he made two appearances for Rot-Weiß Oberhausen in the 2. Bundesliga.

References

External links
 
 
 
 Profile - FC Antwerp

1973 births
Living people
German footballers
Association football midfielders
Germany youth international footballers
Belgian Pro League players
2. Bundesliga players
Leicester City F.C. players
Royal Antwerp F.C. players
Wuppertaler SV players
Rot-Weiß Oberhausen players
MSV Duisburg players
Germania Teveren players
German expatriate footballers
German expatriate sportspeople in Belgium
Expatriate footballers in Belgium
German expatriate sportspeople in England
Expatriate footballers in England
Footballers from Cologne